David Michael Pesetsky (born 1957) is an American linguist. He is the Ferrari P. Ward Professor of Modern Languages and Linguistics and former Head of the Department of Linguistics and Philosophy at the Massachusetts Institute of Technology.

Education
He received a B.A. in linguistics from Yale in 1977 and a Ph.D. in linguistics from the Massachusetts Institute of Technology in 1982.

Career
Pesetsky taught at the University of Southern California and the University of Massachusetts Amherst before joining the faculty of MIT in 1988. Pesetsky was elected a Fellow of the American Association for the Advancement of Science in 2011, and a Fellow of the Linguistic Society of America in 2013.

He has published articles and books within the framework of generative grammar.  A specialist in syntax, he has published on the cross-linguistic properties of wh-movement as well as the theory of argument structure.  In a collaboration with Esther Torrego, he developed a theory of grammatical case in noun phrases, arguing that nominative and accusative cases are the mirror image for the nominal system of phi feature agreement in the verbal system.  He has worked extensively on the structure of Russian, and recently has argued (in collaboration with Jonah Katz) that the syntax of tonal music is identical to the structure of language.

In an article coauthored with Andrew Nevins and Cilene Rodrigues, Pesetsky criticized claims by Daniel Everett concerning the Pirahã language, touching off a protracted debate in the pages of the journal Language.

Notes

External links
 Homepage
 

Living people
Linguists from the United States
Generative linguistics
Syntacticians
MIT School of Humanities, Arts, and Social Sciences faculty
University of Massachusetts Amherst faculty
1957 births
Fellows of the American Association for the Advancement of Science
Fellows of the Linguistic Society of America